Sir Alistair George James MacFarlane   (9 May 1931 – 2 November 2021) was a Scottish electrical engineer and leading academic who served as Principal and Vice Chancellor of Heriot-Watt University, Edinburgh, and Rector, University of the Highlands and Islands.

Early career 
Born on 9 May 1931, MacFarlane was educated at the former Hamilton Academy described by Sir Tam Dalyell as "a remarkable school... acting as a magnet for the most academically gifted youngsters of Lanarkshire".

He continued his studies at the University of Glasgow from which he graduated BSc and was (thereafter awarded DSc), the University of London, PhD and the University of Manchester, MSc.

Following working as an engineer with the laboratories of the Metropolitan-Vickers Electrical Company Ltd., in 1959 Alistair MacFarlane was appointed Lecturer, Electrical Engineering, at Queen Mary College, University of London; promoted to Reader in 1965.

Transferring to University of Manchester Institute of Science and Technology in 1966 as Reader in Control Engineering, he was appointed Professor in 1969. Moving on to the University of Cambridge, MacFarlane was there appointed Professor of Control Engineering (1974–1990) and served as Head, Information Engineering Division, and Fellow, Selwyn College, Cambridge, 1974–78, and as Vice-Master, 1980–88. He has been an Honorary Fellow of the college since 1978.

Later career 

From 1993 to 1998, MacFarlane served as chairman, Scottish Council for Research in Education and as chairman, Scottish Library and Information Council, 1994–98. Other appointments have included, non-Executive Directorship, British Nuclear Fuels (1994–2000); Member, BT Advisory Forum in Scotland, 1996–98; Consultant Editor, International Journal of Control and Membership of the Science and Engineering Research Council Computer Board, Joint Policy Committee for National Facilities for Advanced Research Computing, Advisory Committee on Safety of Nuclear Installations.

From 1989 to 1996, Alistair MacFarlane served as Principal and Vice Chancellor, Heriot-Watt University, Edinburgh and from 1998 to 2000 as Chairman of the Advisory Group for the Scottish University for Industry. Appointed Chairman of the Academic Advisory Board, University of the Highlands and Islands Project (1999–2002), Macfarlane also served as Acting Chief Executive Officer (2000–01) and as Rector, University of the Highlands and Islands, from 2001 to 2004.

He died on 2 November 2021.

Honours and awards 
Alistair MacFarlane was appointed CBE in 1987 and served as vice-president of the Royal Society from 1997 to 1999, and was a Fellow of the Royal Society of Edinburgh ; Fellow, Institution of Electrical Engineers; and Fellow of the Royal Academy of Engineering.
He was awarded the American Society of Mechanical Engineers Centennial Medal, in 1980; Sir Harold Hartley Medal, Institute of Measurement and Control, in 1982; Institution of Electrical Engineers Achievement Medal, in 1992, and its Faraday Medal, in 1993 and the American Society of Mechanical Engineers Oldenburger Medal, in 2004. In 1998 Professor MacFarlane was appointed an Honorary Member of the Chartered Institute of Library and Information Professionals in Scotland.

Alistair MacFarlane was invested with a knighthood in 2002, for services to education and science.

Bibliography

References

External links 
 Heriot-Watt University
 University of the Highlands and Islands

1931 births
2021 deaths
People educated at Hamilton Academy
Alumni of the University of Glasgow
Alumni of the University of London
Alumni of the University of Manchester
British electrical engineers
Academics of Queen Mary University of London
Academics of the University of Manchester Institute of Science and Technology
Fellows of Selwyn College, Cambridge
British Telecom people
Academics of Heriot-Watt University
Academics of the University of the Highlands and Islands
Commanders of the Order of the British Empire
Fellows of the Royal Society
Fellows of the Royal Society of Edinburgh
Fellows of the Royal Academy of Engineering
ASME Medal recipients
Knights Bachelor
Scottish knights
Professors of engineering (Cambridge)